Poochinski is a 1990 unsold television pilot.

Plot
The story follows Chicago police detective Stanley Poochinski (played by Peter Boyle), whose spirit is transferred into a flatulent English bulldog after he is killed in the line of duty. The canine detective then returns to solving crimes.

Fate
NBC decided not to pick up the series, but subsequently did air the pilot, on July 9, 1990. In recent years, the show's premise has been recognized as one of the most bizarre in television history. On July 10, 2018, The Last Podcast on the Left aired the pilot in its entirety on their live stream on the Adult Swim website.

Primary cast
 George Newbern as Det. Robert McKay
 Amy Yasbeck as Frannie Reynolds
 Frank McRae as Capt. Ed Martin
 Brian Haley as Sgt. Shriver
 Peter Boyle as Stanley Poochinski

References

External links
 
 Cinema Snob's take on the 1990 pilot

1990 television specials
Unaired television pilots
NBC television specials
Television pilots not picked up as a series
Television shows about dogs
1990s American television specials